Schuller (or Schüller) is the surname of:
 Ed Schuller, musician
 Eugène Schueller, founder of L'Oréal
 Tom Schueller
 Christina Schuller, see People on Laguna Beach
 George Schuller, musician
 Gunther Schuller, musician
 Hans Schüller, rally driver
 Heidi Schüller, athlete
 Ivan K. Schuller, physicist
 Kyla Schuller, academic and author
 Lea Schüller (born 1997), German footballer
 Rasmus Schüller, Finnish footballer
 Robert A. Schuller, televangelist, son of Robert H. Schuller
 Robert H. Schuller, televangelist
 Bobby Schuller, televangelist, son of Robert A. Schuller
 Sébastien Schuller, French singer
 Wendy Schuller (born 1970), American basketball coach

See also
 Schuler, surname
 Schouweiler, Luxemburg
 Schüller, Germany
 Schull (disambiguation)

German-language surnames
Dutch-language surnames
Occupational surnames